Mount Mercer is a locality in the Western District of the Australian state of Victoria.  It is named after a nearby scoria cone with crater.  The scoria cone was developed on a broad lava shield and the rim of the cone is asymmetric, being higher around the south and open towards the north. The scoria cone is approximately 400m in diameter and of circular shape. It is sufficiently enclosed to contain a swamp and has been partly excavated for a reservoir.  It stands approximately 75m above the surrounding area.

One of Victoria's larger wind farms, the Mount Mercer Wind Farm became fully operational in September 2014.

References

Towns in Victoria (Australia)
Golden Plains Shire